Oscularia lunata is a species of succulent flowering plant in the genus Oscularia. It is endemic to the Fynbos region in the Western Cape.

References 

Aizoaceae
 
Plants described in 1998